The Fairly OddParents is an American animated television series created by Butch Hartman for Nickelodeon. The series follows the adventures of Timmy Turner, a 10-year-old boy who is neglected by his parents and abused by his babysitter, Vicky. One day, he is granted two fairy godparents named Cosmo and Wanda who grant him his every wish to improve his miserable life. However, these wishes usually backfire and cause a series of problems that Timmy must fix.

Prior to the creation of The Fairly OddParents, Hartman was working at Cartoon Network on Dexter's Laboratory and Johnny Bravo. The series is based on a series of Frederator's Oh Yeah! Cartoons, beginning with the short "The Fairly OddParents!". From 1998 until 2002, the Oh Yeah! Cartoons series aired ten Fairly OddParents shorts with a run time of seven and a half minutes each. The show's success has spanned three Jimmy Timmy Power Hour crossover movies and three full-length live-action films. Notable television films include "Abra-Catastrophe!", which aired in 2003, and "Channel Chasers", which aired a year later in 2004. The latest film, A Fairly Odd Summer was released in 2014. The first eight seasons, with the help of Amazon, were released on DVD in 2012. After a year-long hiatus, the series returned in 2013 with its ninth season, which began airing on March 23, 2013 with the half-hour special "Fairly OddPet".

On August 17, 2015, a tenth season was officially announced, and it introduced another new character named Chloe Carmichael, Timmy's new neighbor who also has Cosmo and Wanda as her fairy godparents due to a fairy shortage. On December 30, 2015, Nickelodeon's Twitter posted the new character's picture, and the Season 10 premiere date, January 15, 2016. The series moved to Nicktoons in 2017 to air the remainder of Season 10, which switched to Flash animation beginning with its fourteenth episode. 

The series ended on July 26, 2017, with 172 episodes spanning ten seasons. A live-action/animated sequel of the series premiered on Paramount+ on March 31, 2022.

Series overview

Episodes

All of the episodes of The Fairly OddParents listed below are arranged in their packaging order, rather than their original production or broadcast order.

Shorts (1998–2002)

Season 1 (2001)

Season 2 (2001–03)

Season 3 (2002–03)

Season 4 (2003–05)

Season 5 (2004–06)

Season 6 (2008–09)

Season 7 (2009–12)

Season 8 (2011)

Season 9 (2013–15)

Season 10 (2016–17)

Live action television films

Notes

References 

Fairly OddParents
Episodes
Fairly OddParents